This is the complete list of Olympic medalists in field hockey.



Men

Women

References

 

Field hockey

Olympic